Linn Bjørnland, is a Scottish Norwegian actress. She has appeared on HBO's True Blood, the NBC production Grimm, TNT's Leverage, CW's Hart of Dixie, Code Black and the Lifetime's TV movie Secrets in Suburbia.

Filmography

Film

Television

References

Norwegian television actresses
Living people
Year of birth missing (living people)